Ray Chang (born March 31, 1985), formerly known as Bryant Chang, is a Taiwanese actor. He is known for his role in Eternal Summer, for which he won the Best New Performer award at the 2006 Golden Horse Awards.

Filmography

Film

Television

Music video

Theater

Awards and nominations

References

External links 
 
 

Taiwanese male film actors
1985 births
Living people
Taiwanese male television actors
21st-century Taiwanese male actors
Place of birth missing (living people)